Mohammad Rakib (born 8 December 1998) is a Bangladeshi cricketer. He made his List A debut for Abahani Limited in the 2017–18 Dhaka Premier Division Cricket League on 2 March 2018. He made his Twenty20 debut for Shinepukur Cricket Club in the 2018–19 Dhaka Premier Division Twenty20 Cricket League on 25 February 2019. Prior to his List A debut, he was named in Bangladesh's squad for the 2018 Under-19 Cricket World Cup.

References

External links
 

1998 births
Living people
Bangladeshi cricketers
Abahani Limited cricketers
Shinepukur Cricket Club cricketers
Place of birth missing (living people)